Joseph Meehan or Joe Meehan may refer to:

 Joseph Meehan (horticulturalist)
 Joseph Meehan (basketball), former head coach of La Salle Explorers men's basketball
 Joseph Meehan (wrestler), ring name Joey Ryan, professional wrestler
Joe Meehan, Australian rules footballer